Zagros Paleolithic Museum is a museum in Kermanshah, Iran, established in 2008. The museum contains a large collection of stone tools and animal fossil bones from various Paleolithic sites in Iran. In Iran, it is the only museum of its kind.

History
The museum was established by Fereidoun Biglari and A. Moradi Bisetouni at Tekieh Biglar Baigi, Kermanshah in 2007. Marjan Mashkour, a zooarchaeologist, was in charge of animal fossil identification for the museum.

Collections
Zagros Paleolithic Museum occupies four rooms which include objects from various Paleolithic and Neolithic sites in Iran, dating from ca. 1,000,000 years to some 8,000 years ago. The first room is an audio room where visitors can watch a documentary about prehistoric stone tools and how Paleolithic artisans made these tools. There is also a full life-size model of a Neanderthal.

The second room is dedicated to human and animal bones from sites on the Zagros Mountains and some human skull replicas from famous Paleolithic sites in Europe and the Near East. Among the faunal remains, the fossil collection from the  Wezmeh cave is of prime importance. The third room contains Lower Paleolithic stone tools from various sites such as Kashafrud, Ganj Par and Shiwatoo.  The fourth room houses late Paleolithic and Neolithic stone tools, animal bones, shells and other archaeological objects which are also from sites on the Zagros mountains.

References
 Biglari, F., 2010 The Zagros Paleolithic Museum Guide, Iranian Cultural Heritage, Handicrafts and Tourism Organization, Kermanshah
 Mashkour, M., H. Monchot, E. Trinkaus, J-L. Reyss, F. Biglari, S. Bailon, S. Heydari, K. Abdi 2009 Carnivores and their prey in the Wezmeh Cave (Kermanshah, Iran): A Late Pleistocene refuge in the Zagros, International Journal of Osteoarchaeology 19: 678-694.

Museums in Iran
Archaeological museums in Iran
Buildings and structures in Kermanshah
Neanderthals
Paleolithic
Tourist attractions in Kermanshah Province
Museums established in 2007
2007 establishments in Iran